The Judgement of Paris is a story from Greek mythology, which was one of the events that led up to the Trojan War and in later versions of the story to the foundation of Rome.

Eris, the goddess of discord, was not invited to the wedding of Peleus and Thetis. In revenge, Eris brought a golden apple, inscribed, "To the fairest one," which she threw into the wedding. Three goddesses, Hera, Athena and Aphrodite, agreed to have Paris of Troy choose the fairest one. Paris chose Aphrodite, because she bribed him by giving him the most beautiful woman in the world, Helen of Sparta, wife of Menelaus. Paris carried Helen off to Troy, and the Greeks invaded Troy for Helen's return. This was the cause of the Trojan War. 

Figuratively, the phrase "The Judgement of Paris" can mean the ultimate origin of a war or other event.

Sources of the episode

As with many mythological tales, details vary depending on the source. The brief allusion to the Judgement in the Iliad (24.25–30) shows that the episode initiating all the subsequent action was already familiar to its audience; a fuller version was told in the Cypria, a lost work of the Epic Cycle, of which only fragments (and a reliable summary) remain. The later writers Ovid (Heroides 16.71ff, 149–152 and 5.35f), Lucian (Dialogues of the Gods 20), Pseudo-Apollodorus (Bibliotheca, E.3.2) and Hyginus (Fabulae 92), retell the story with skeptical, ironic or popularizing agendas. It appeared wordlessly on the ivory and gold votive chest of the 7th-century BC tyrant Cypselus at Olympia, which was described by Pausanias as showing:

The subject was favoured by ancient Greek vase painters as early as the sixth century BC, and remained popular in Greek and Roman art, before enjoying a significant revival as an opportunity to show three female nudes, in the Renaissance.

Mythic narrative

It is recounted that Zeus held a banquet in celebration of the marriage of Peleus and Thetis (parents of Achilles). However, Eris, goddess of discord, was not invited, for it was believed she would have made the party unpleasant for everyone. Angered by this snub, Eris arrived at the celebration with a golden apple from the Garden of the Hesperides, which she threw into the proceedings as a prize of beauty. According to some later versions, upon the apple was the inscription καλλίστῃ (kallistēi, "To/for the fairest one").

Three goddesses claimed the apple: Hera, Athena and Aphrodite. They asked Zeus to judge which of them was fairest, and eventually he, reluctant to favor any claim himself, declared that Paris, a Trojan mortal, would judge their cases, for he had recently shown his exemplary fairness in a contest in which Ares in bull form had bested Paris's own prize bull, and the shepherd-prince had unhesitatingly awarded the prize to the god.

With Hermes as their guide, the three candidates bathed in the spring of Ida, then met Paris on Mount Ida. While Paris inspected them, each attempted with her powers to bribe him; Hera offered to make him king of Europe and Asia, Athena offered wisdom and skill in war, and Aphrodite, who had the Charites and the Horai to enhance her charms with flowers and song (according to a fragment of the Cypria quoted by Athenagoras of Athens), offered the world's most beautiful woman (Euripides, Andromache, l.284, Helena l. 676). This was Helen of Sparta, wife of the Greek king Menelaus. Paris accepted Aphrodite's gift and awarded the apple to her, receiving Helen as well as the enmity of the Greeks and especially of Hera. The Greeks' expedition to retrieve Helen from Paris in Troy is the mythological basis of the Trojan War. According to some stories Helen of Troy was kidnapped by Paris and group of Trojans, in others she simply followed Paris willingly because, she too, felt affection for him.

The story of the Judgement of Paris naturally offered artists the opportunity to depict a sort of beauty contest between three beautiful female nudes, but the myth, at least since Euripides, rather concerns a choice among the gifts that each goddess embodies. The bribery involved is ironic and a late ingredient.

According to a tradition suggested by Alfred J. Van Windekens, "cow-eyed" Hera was indeed the most beautiful, not Aphrodite. However, Hera was the goddess of the marital order and of cuckolded wives, amongst other things. She was often portrayed as the shrewish, jealous wife of Zeus, who himself often escaped from her controlling ways by cheating on her with other women, mortal and immortal. She had fidelity and chastity in mind and was careful to be modest when Paris was inspecting her. Aphrodite, though not as beautiful as Hera, was the goddess of sexuality, and was effortlessly more sexual and charming before him. Thus, she was able to sway Paris into judging her as the fairest. Athena's beauty is rarely commented on in the myths, perhaps because Greeks held her up as an asexual being, able to "overcome" her "womanly weaknesses" to become both wise and talented in war (both considered male domains by the Greeks). Her rage at losing makes her join the Greeks in the battle against Paris's Trojans, a key event in the turning point of the war.

In art

The subject became popular in art from the late Middle Ages onwards. All three goddesses were usually shown nude, though in ancient art only Aphrodite is ever unclothed, and not always. The opportunity for three female nudes was a large part of the attraction of the subject. It appeared in illuminated manuscripts and was popular in decorative art, including 15th-century Italian inkstands and other works in maiolica, and cassoni. As a subject for easel paintings, it was more common in Northern Europe, although Marcantonio Raimondi's engraving of c. 1515, probably based on a drawing by Raphael, and using a composition derived from a Roman sarcophagus, was a highly influential treatment, which made Paris's Phrygian cap an attribute in most later versions.

The subject was painted many (supposedly 23) times by Lucas Cranach the Elder, and was especially attractive to Northern Mannerist painters. Rubens painted several compositions of the subject at different points in his career. Watteau and Angelica Kauffman were among the artists who painted the subject in the 18th century. The Judgement of Paris was painted frequently by academic artists of the 19th century, and less often by their more progressive contemporaries such as Renoir and Cézanne. Later artists who have painted the subject include André Lhote, Enrique Simonet (El Juicio de Paris 1904), and Salvador Dalí.

Ivo Saliger (1939), Adolf Ziegler (1939), and Joseph Thorak (1941) also used the classic myth to propagate German renewal during the Nazi period.

In Discordianism
Kallistēi is the word of the ancient Greek language inscribed on Eris' Apple of Discord. In Greek, the word is καλλίστῃ (the dative singular of the feminine superlative of καλος, beautiful). Its meaning can be rendered "to the fairest one". Calliste (Καλλίστη; Mod. Gk. Kallisti) is also an ancient name for the isle of Thera.

The word Kallisti (Modern Greek) written on a golden apple, has become a principal symbol of Discordianism, a post-modernist religion. In non-philological texts (such as Discordian ones) the word is usually spelled as καλλιστι. Most versions of Principia Discordia actually spell it as καλλιχτι, but this is definitely incorrect; in the afterword of the 1979 Loompanics edition of Principia, Gregory Hill says that was because on the IBM typewriter he used, not all Greek letters coincided with Latin ones, and he didn't know enough of the letters to spot the mistake. Zeus' failure to invite Eris is referred to as The Original Snub in Discordian mythology.

Cultural references
The story is the basis of an opera, The Judgement of Paris, with a libretto by William Congreve, that was set to music by four composers in London, 1700–1701. Thomas Arne composed a highly successful score to the same libretto in 1742. The opera Le Cinesi (The Chinese Women) by Christoph Willibald Gluck (1754) concludes with a ballet, The Judgement of Paris, sung as a vocal quartet. Francesco Cilea's 1902 opera Adriana Lecouvreur also includes a Judgement of Paris ballet sequence.

The story is the basis of an earlier opera, Il pomo d'oro, in a prologue and five acts by the Italian composer Antonio Cesti, with a libretto by Francesco Sbarra (1611–1668). It was first performed before the imperial court in a specially constructed open-air theatre Vienna in 1668. The work was so long it had to be staged over the course of two days: the Prologue, Acts One and Two were given on July 12; Acts Three, Four and Five on July 14. The staging was unprecedented for its magnificence (and expense). The designer Ludovico Ottavio Burnacini provided no fewer than 24 sets and there were plenty of opportunities for spectacular stage machinery, including shipwrecks and collapsing towers.

Novelist Gore Vidal named his 1952 book, The Judgment of Paris, after this story.

The Judgement of Paris was burlesqued in the 1954 musical The Golden Apple. In it, the three goddesses have been reduced to three town biddies in smalltown Washington state. They ask Paris, a traveling salesman, to judge the cakes they have made for the church social. Each woman (the mayor's wife, the schoolmarm, and the matchmaker) makes appeals to Paris, who chooses the matchmaker. The matchmaker, in turn, sets him up with Helen, the town floozy, who runs off with him.

The Judgement of Paris is featured in the 2003 TV miniseries Helen of Troy. The event is brief, and only Hera and Aphrodite offer bribes. All three goddesses remain fully clothed. Aphrodite gives Paris a vision of Helen, while Helen has a reciprocal vision of Paris.

In the Hercules: The Legendary Journeys series, the contest is altered somewhat with Aphrodite and Athena entering but Artemis is the third goddess contestant instead of Hera (offering the one who chooses her the chance to be renowned as a great warrior). The Golden Apple appears as a gift from Aphrodite with the ability to make any mortal woman fall in love with the man holding it and to make a mortal man and woman soul mates if they simultaneously touch it. The other major differences beside the presence of Artemis and the role of the apple are the fact that it is Ëlaus who is the judge and the goddesses appear in swimsuits and not nude.

In "Casebook of the Black Widowers", a collection of short mystery stories by Isaac Asimov published in 1980, the last story in the volume is "To the Barest" The plot of the story is that one of the founding members of the Black Widowers, Ralph Ottur, dies and leaves a will requiring the group to solve a pun riddle. The lawyer reading the will at the meeting is one Matthew Parris. The pun on the name of the attorney, who has to select which of the current members of the group is "the barest" leads to the decision made as to which member of the group gets the inheritance, as "the Judgement of Parris" and the tale of the Apple of Eris is told in the course of the story.

Gallery

Classical literature sources 
Chronological listing of classical literature sources for The Judgement of Paris, including the Apple of Discord':

 Homer, Iliad 24. 25 ff (trans. Murray) (Greek epic C8th BC)
 Euripides, Iphigenia in Aulis 1290 ff (trans. Coleridge) (Greek tragedy C5th BC)
 Euripides, Hecuba 629 ff (trans. Coleridge)
 Euripides, Hecuba 669 ff
 Euripides, The Trojan Women 924 ff (trans. Coleridge)
 Euripides, Helen 20 ff (trans Coleridge)
 Euripides, Helen 675 ff
 Euripides, Andromache 274 ff (trans. Coleridge)
 Gorgias, The Encomium on Helen 5 (The Classical Weekly Feb. 15, 1913 trans. Van Hook p. 123) (Greek philosophy C5th BC)
 P. Oxy. 663, Cratinus, Argument of Cratinus' Dionysalexandrus 2. 12-9 (trans. Grenfell & Hunt) (Greek poetry C5th BC)
 Scholiast on P. Oxy. 663, Argument of Cratinus' Dionysalexandrus 2. 12-9 (The Oxyrhynchus Papyri trans. Grenfell & Hunt 1904 Vol 4 p. 70)
 Isocrates, Helen 41–52 (trans. Norlin) (Greek philosophy C4th BC)
 Plato, Republic 2. 379e ff (trans. Shorey) (Greek philosophy C4th BC)
 Scholiast on Plato, Republic 2. 379e ff (Plato The Republic Books I-V trans. Shorey Vol 5 1937 1930 p. 186)
 Aristotle, Rhetorica 1. 6. 20 ff (trans. Rhys Roberts) (Greek philosophy C4th BC)
 Aristotle, Rhetorica 2. 23. 12 ff
 Xenophon, Banquet (or Symposium) 4. 19. 20 ff (trans. Brownson) (Greek philosophy C4th BC)
 Lycophron, Alexandria 93 ff, (trans. A. Mair) (Greek epic C3rd BC)
 Scholiast on Alexandria 93 ff (Callimachus and Lycophron trans. A. Mair Aratus trans. G. Mair 1921 p. 501)
 Callimachus, Hymn 5. 17 ff (trans. Mair) (Greek poet C3rd BC)
 Herodas, Mime 1. 35 (trans. Headlam ed. Knox) (Greek poetry C3rd BC)
 Catullus, The Poems of Catullus 61. 17 (trans. Cornish) (Latin poetry C1st BC)
 Diodorus Siculus, Library of History 17. 7. 4 ff (trans. Oldfather) (Greek history C1st BC)
 Scholiast on Diodorus Siculus, Library of History 17. 7. 4 ff (Diodorus of Sicily trans. Oldfather 1963 Vol 8 pp. 135)
 Horace, Carminum 3. 3. 19 (trans. Bennett) (Roman lyric poetry C1st BC)
 Scholiast on Horace, Carminum 3. 3. 19 (Horace Odes and Erodes trans. Bennett 1901 p. 312)
 Cicero, The Letters to his Friends 1. 9. 13 ff (trans. Williams) (Roman epigram C1st BC)
 Ovid, Heroides 16. 137 (trans. Showerman) (Roman poetry C1st BC to C1st AD)
 Ovid, Heroides 17. 115 ff
 Ovid, Fasti 4. 120 ff (trans. Frazer) (Roman epic C1st BC to C1st AD)
 Ovid, Fasti 6. 44 ff
 Strabo, Geography 13. 1. 51 (trans. Jones) (Greek geography C1st BC to C1st AD)
 Lucan, Pharsalia 9. 971 ff (trans. Riley) (Roman poetry C1st AD)
 Scholiast on Lucan, Pharsalia 9. 971 (The Pharsalia of Lucan Riley 1853 p. 378)
 Petronius, Satyricon 138 ff (trans. Heseltine) (Roman satire C1st AD)
 Scholiast on Petronius, Satyricon 138 ff (Petronius and Seneca Apocolocyntosis trans. Heseltine & Rouse 1925 p. 318)
 Pliny, Natural History 34. 19. 77 ff (trans. Rackham) (Roman history C1st AD)
 Lucian, The Carousal, or The Lapiths 35 ff (trans. Harmon) (Assyrian satire C2nd AD)
 Lucian, The Judgement of the Goddesses 1–16 (end) (trans. Harmon) (Assyrian satire C2nd AD)
 Lucian, The Dance 45 ff (trans. Harmon)
 Lucian, Dialogues of the Sea-Gods 301 ff (trans. Harmon)
 Pseudo-Lucian, Charidemus 10 ff (trans. Macleod)
 Pseudo-Apollodorus, Epitome 3. 3 (trans. Frazer) (Greek mythography C2nd AD)
 Scholiast on Pseudo-Apollodorus, Epitome 3. 3 (Apollodorus The Library trans. Frazer 1921 Vol 2 pp. 172–73)
 Pseudo-Hyginus, Fabulae 92 (trans. Grant) (Roman mythography C2nd AD)
 Pausanias, Description of Greece 3. 18. 12 ff (trans. Frazer) (Greek travelogue C2nd AD)
 Pausanias, Description of Greece 5. 19. 5 ff
 Apuleius, The Golden Ass 4. 30 ff (trans. Adlington & Gaselee) (Latin prose C2nd AD)
 Apuleius, The Golden Ass 10. 30–33 (trans. Adlington & Gaselee)
 Longus, Daphnis and Chloe Book 3 (The Athenian Society's Publications IV: Longus 1896 p. 108) (Greek romance C2nd AD)
 P. Oxy. 1231, Sappho, Book 1 Fragment 1. 13 ff (The Oxyrhynchus Papyri trans. Grenfell & Hunt 1914 Vol 10 p. 40) (Greek poetry C2nd AD)
 Clement of Alexandria, Exhortation to the Greeks 2. 29 P. ff (trans. Butterworth) (Christian philosophy C2nd to C3rd AD)
 Tertullian, Apologeticus 15. 15 ff (trans. Souter & Mayor) (Christian philosophy C2nd to C3rd AD)
 Athenaeus, Banquet of the Learned 12. 2 (trans. Yonge) (Greek rhetoric C2nd to C3rd AD)
 Psudeo-Proclus, Cypria (Hesiod the Homeric Hymns and Homerica trans. Evelyn-White pp. 488–91) (C2nd to C5th AD)
 Colluthus, The Rape of Helen 59–210 (trans. Mair) (Greek epic C5th to C6th AD)
 Scholiast on Colluthus, The Rape of Helen 59 ff (Oppian Colluthus Tryphiodorus trans. Mair 1928 pp. 546–47)
 Servius, Servius In Vergilii Aeneidos 1. 27 ff (trans. Thilo) (Greek commentary C4th to 11th AD)
 First Vatican Mythographer, Scriptores rerum mythicarum 208 (ed. Bode) (Greek and Roman mythography C9th AD to C11th AD)
 Second Vatican Mythographer, Scriptores rerum mythicarum 205 (ed. Bode) (Greek and Roman mythography C11th AD)
 Tzetzes, Scholia on Lycophron Cassandra (or Alexandria) 93 (Scholia on Lycophron ed. Müller 1811 p. 93) (Byzantine commentary C12th AD)

See also
Feast of the Gods (art)
Trojan War

Notes

References
 Apollodorus, Apollodorus, The Library, with an English Translation by Sir James George Frazer, F.B.A., F.R.S. in 2 Volumes. Cambridge, Massachusetts, Harvard University Press; London, William Heinemann Ltd. 1921. Online version at the Perseus Digital Library.
 Bull, Malcolm, The Mirror of the Gods, How Renaissance Artists Rediscovered the Pagan Gods, Oxford UP, 2005, .
 Kerényi, Carl, The Heroes of the Greeks, Thames and Hudson, London, 1959.
 Pausanias, Pausanias Description of Greece with an English Translation by W.H.S. Jones, Litt.D., and H.A. Ormerod, M.A., in 4 Volumes.'' Cambridge, Massachusetts, Harvard University Press; London, William Heinemann Ltd. 1918. Online version at the Perseus Digital Library.

External links

The Judgment of Paris
Full-text of Bulfinch's Mythology

 
Trojan War
Eris (mythology)
Deeds of Zeus
Deeds of Aphrodite
Deeds of Athena
Deeds of Hera
Deeds of Hermes

el:Πάρις#Η «Κρίση του Πάρι»